Elenborough Park may refer to:

Ellenborough Park, Weston-super-Mare
Ellenborough Park Hotel